The I Cavalry Corps, initially known simply as the Cavalry Corps, or alternatively as Cavalry Corps Harteneck after its commander, was an army corps of the German Wehrmacht during World War II. It was formed in 1944 and existed until 1945.

History 
The Cavalry Corps was formed on 25 May 1944 in the General Government, using most of the personnel of the short-lived LXXVIII Army Corps. The corps was commanded throughout its lifetime by Gustav Harteneck, earning it the nickname Cavalry Corps Harteneck. The corps served at times under the 2nd Army, 4th Army, 6th Army and 2nd Panzer Army. 

Starting in June 1944, the Cavalry Corps was deployed on the Eastern Front against the Red Army. The corps, not yet fully deployed and operational, was thrown against the Soviet forces that advanced against the German lines as part of Operation Bagration, the Soviet offensive which brought about the collapse of the German Army Group Centre. After the end of Bagration, the Cavalry Corps fought at the Narew river and in East Prussia.

The Cavalry Corps was known as I Cavalry Corps starting in February 1945.

The I Cavalry Corps participated in the failed Operation Spring Awakening in March 1945, the last major German offensive during World War II. After the failure of Spring Awakening, the I Cavalry Corps staged a fighting retreat towards Austria. After German surrender on 8 May 1945, the corps, still largely intact, was taken prisoner by British Army forces and transported to Württemberg and Hesse. Subsequently, the surrendered formations were formally dissolved by the United States Army in June 1945. The horses were confiscated by the Allies and repurposed for agricultural tasks.

Legacy 
The I Cavalry Corps was the last major cavalry formation in German military history. After the re-establishment of independent German military forces in 1955, the Bundeswehr of West Germany and the National People's Army of East Germany did not establish significant cavalry formations.

Structure

Noteworthy individuals 

 Gustav Harteneck, corps commander.

See also 

 1st Cavalry Division
1st Cossack Cavalry Division
 XV SS Cossack Cavalry Corps

External links 

 I. Kavalleriekorps (1.), Lexikon der Wehrmacht (in German).
 Das I. Kavallerie-Korps, Balsi.de (in German).

References 

Corps of Germany in World War II
Military units and formations established in 1944
Military units and formations disestablished in 1945